Sainte-Anne-de-Sabrevois is a parish municipality in the province of Quebec, Canada, located in the Regional County Municipality of Le Haut-Richelieu. The population as of the Canada 2011 Census was 2,074.

Demographics 

Education

The South Shore Protestant Regional School Board previously served the municipality.

See also
List of parish municipalities in Quebec

References

Incorporated places in Le Haut-Richelieu Regional County Municipality
Parish municipalities in Quebec